Archibald Bard Darragh (December 23, 1840 – February 21, 1927) was a politician from the U.S. state of Michigan.

Life and politics
Bard was born in La Salle Township, Michigan, and attended the common schools and a private academy in Monroe. He entered the University of Michigan at Ann Arbor in 1857 and pursued a classical course for two years. He moved to Claiborne County, Mississippi, and became a teacher. He returned to Michigan upon the outbreak of the Civil War and enlisted in Company H, Eighteenth Regiment, Michigan Volunteer Infantry, in 1862. He was commissioned second lieutenant, Company D, Ninth Regiment, Michigan Volunteer Cavalry, in 1863; promoted to first lieutenant in 1864 and captain in 1865. After the war, he returned to Michigan and became superintendent of the public schools of Jackson in 1867. He reentered the University of Michigan and graduated in 1868.  He moved to St. Louis, Michigan, in 1870 and engaged in banking. He was elected treasurer of Gratiot County, Michigan, in 1872; was a member of the Michigan House of Representatives, 1882–1883. He was mayor of St. Louis in 1893 and a member of the board of control of the State asylum.

Darragh was elected as a Republican from Michigan's 11th congressional district to the 57th and to the three succeeding Congresses, serving from March 4, 1901, to March 3, 1909. He was not a candidate for renomination in 1908 and again engaged in banking.

Darragh died at the age of eighty-six in St. Louis, Michigan, and is interred there at Oak Grove Cemetery.

References

The Political Graveyard
Voting records

1840 births
1927 deaths
Republican Party members of the Michigan House of Representatives
Mayors of places in Michigan
Union Army officers
Burials in Michigan
People of Michigan in the American Civil War
University of Michigan alumni
Republican Party members of the United States House of Representatives from Michigan
People from Monroe County, Michigan
People from St. Louis, Michigan
19th-century American politicians
20th-century American politicians